James A. Ibers was the Charles E. and Emma H. Morrison Professor of Chemistry before becoming an emeritus professor of chemistry at Northwestern University upon retirement. He is recognized for contributions to inorganic chemistry, especially in the areas of coordination chemistry, bio-inorganic chemistry, solid state synthesis and X-ray crystallography.  Ibers passed on December 14, 2021 at the age of 91.

Education
Ibers received his B.S. and Ph.D. degrees at California Institute of Technology. His thesis, awarded in 1954,  was done under the direction of Verner F. Schomoker and James H. Sturdivant.

Career
After graduation, Ibers accepted a staff scientist position at Shell Development Company and later Brookhaven National Laboratory. Starting in 1965 until his retirement, Ibers was a Professor of Chemistry at Northwestern University. His broad research interests included many aspects of organometallic, bioinorganic, and solid state chemistry,. Ibers was a noted pioneer in the applications of X-Ray Crystallography to chemical problems and issues associated with inorganic bonding.

References

Inorganic chemists
 Members of the United States National Academy of Sciences
 Solid state chemists
 Northwestern University faculty
 California Institute of Technology alumni
 Fellows of the American Association for the Advancement of Science